Burack is a surname. Notable people with the surname include:

Ahron Dovid Burack (1892–1960), Lithuanian-American rabbi 
Zahava Burack (1932–2001), American philanthropist

See also
Barack (name)